This is a list of naval flags of the Soviet Union.

Jack

Ensign and flag

Ensigns of auxiliary vessels of the Navy

Flags of ships of Border Guard Force

Naval flag of the Interior Force

Flags of officials

Flags of commanders-in-chief Armed Forces

Flags of commanders-in-chief of the Navy

Flags of officials of the Navy

Flags of officials of auxiliary services of the Navy

Flags of officials of the Border Guard Force

Broad pennants

See also 
 List of Russian navy flags
 List of Russian flags

USSR
 
Flags
Navy flags
USSR
Fla